The Aruba Athletic Federation (AAB; Arubaanse Atletiek Bond) is the governing body for the sport of athletics in Aruba.

History 
AAB was founded on September 6, 1963, and was affiliated to the IAAF in 1986.

Recently, AAB president was Juan "Junior" Dake, and it was reported that he was re-elected in December 2012. However, the IAAF lists former sprinter and two-time Olympian Evelyn Farrell as new president of AAB.

Affiliations 
AAB is the national member federation for Aruba in the following international organisations:
International Association of Athletics Federations (IAAF)
North American, Central American and Caribbean Athletic Association (NACAC)
Association of Panamerican Athletics (APA)
Central American and Caribbean Athletic Confederation (CACAC)
Asociación Iberoamericana de Atletismo (AIA; Ibero-American Athletics Association)

Moreover, it is part of the following national organisations:
Aruban Olympic Committee (COA; Papiamento: Comité Olimpico Arubano)

National records 
AAB maintains the Aruban records in athletics.

External links 
Official webpage
Facebook

References 

Aruba
Athletics in Aruba
Sports governing bodies in Aruba
1963 establishments in Aruba
Sports organizations established in 1963
National governing bodies for athletics